In special relativity, electromagnetism and wave theory, the d'Alembert operator (denoted by a box), also called the d'Alembertian, wave operator, box operator or sometimes quabla operator (cf. nabla symbol) is the Laplace operator of Minkowski space. The operator is named after French mathematician and physicist Jean le Rond d'Alembert.

In Minkowski space, in standard coordinates , it has the form
 

We have assumed units such that the speed of light  = 1.

Lorentz transformations leave the Minkowski metric invariant, so the d'Alembertian yields a Lorentz scalar. The above coordinate expressions remain valid for the standard coordinates in every inertial frame.

The box symbol and alternate notations
There are a variety of notations for the d'Alembertian. The most common are the box symbol  whose four sides represent the four dimensions of space-time and the box-squared symbol  which emphasizes the scalar property through the squared term (much like the Laplacian). In keeping with the triangular notation for the Laplacian, sometimes   is used.

This notation is used extensively in quantum field theory, where partial derivatives are usually indexed, so the lack of an index with the squared partial derivative signals the presence of the d'Alembertian.

Sometimes the box symbol is used to represent the four-dimensional Levi-Civita covariant derivative. The symbol  is then used to represent the space derivatives, but this is coordinate chart dependent.

Applications
The wave equation for small vibrations is of the form 

where  is the displacement.

The wave equation for the electromagnetic field in vacuum is

where   is the electromagnetic four-potential in Lorenz gauge.

The Klein–Gordon equation has the form

Green's function
The Green's function, for the d'Alembertian is defined by the equation 

A special solution is given by the retarded Green's function which corresponds to signal propagation only forward in time

where  is the Heaviside step function.

See also
Four-gradient
d'Alembert's formula
Klein–Gordon equation
Relativistic heat conduction
Ricci calculus
Wave equation
One-way wave equation

References

External links
 
 , originally printed in Rendiconti del Circolo Matematico di Palermo.
 

Differential operators
Hyperbolic partial differential equations